Milton Erick Melgar Cuéllar (born November 20, 1986 in Santa Cruz de la Sierra) is a Bolivian football midfielder. He currently plays for Universitario de Sucre in Bolivia.

Club career
Melgar started out at second division club Deportivo Cooper. In 2005, he made his flight top debut with Aurora. In that season, he played in 7 games scoring one goal. The following year he transferred to hometown club Oriente Petrolero, but his appearances during this period were limited as he spent most of the time on the bench. In 2007, he went abroad to play for Venezuelan side Carabobo FC, but shortly after he returned to Oriente where he stayed for the remaining of that year. Subsequently Bolívar signed him for the 2008 season, but the slim opportunities he was given to exposed himself on the field discouraged his continuance in the club. In 2009, he returned to Venezuela and joined Deportivo Anzoátegui.

Personal life
He is the eldest son of legendary Bolivian midfielder José Milton Melgar, who played for the Bolivia national team in the 1994 FIFA World Cup.

References

External links
 
 
 

1986 births
Living people
Sportspeople from Santa Cruz de la Sierra
Bolivian footballers
Association football midfielders
Club Aurora players
Oriente Petrolero players
Carabobo F.C. players
Club Bolívar players
Deportivo Anzoátegui players
Rio Branco Football Club players
Universitario de Sucre footballers
Club Real Potosí players
Bolivian expatriate footballers
Expatriate footballers in Venezuela
Bolivian expatriate sportspeople in Venezuela